Cyril Bridge (28 August 1909 – 27 January 1988) was an English footballer who played as a left back. He made over 150 Football League appearances in the years before the Second World War.

Career
Bridge played locally for St Philips Marsh Adult School in the Bristol & District League. Joe Bradshaw signed Bridge in August 1930 for Bristol City. After retirement Bridge remained local until his death in 1988 when his ashes were scattered on the pitch at Ashton Gate.

References

1909 births
1988 deaths
English footballers
Association football fullbacks
English Football League players
Bristol City F.C. players
Footballers from Bristol